Yellowhead is a Canadian short film, directed by Kevan Funk and released in 2013. The film stars Paul McGillion as an emotionally detached industrial safety inspector travelling to mining and natural resource sites along the Yellowhead Highway in rural Alberta and British Columbia while neglecting his own health.

The cast also includes Michael Kopsa and Kurt Max Runte.

The film premiered at the 2013 Toronto International Film Festival, where it received an honorable mention from the jury for the Best Canadian Short Film award. It was subsequently screened at the 2013 Calgary International Film Festival, where Funk won the Alberta Spirit Award.

It was later named to TIFF's annual year-end Canada's Top Ten list of the year's best Canadian short films.

References

External links
 

2013 films
2013 short films
Films directed by Kevan Funk
Films shot in Alberta
Films set in Alberta
2010s English-language films
Canadian drama short films
2010s Canadian films